The following is a timeline of the history of the city of Duisburg, Germany.

Prior to 20th century

 12thC. - Attained the rank of an imperial free town.
 1290 - Duisburg becomes part of Cleves.
 1361 - Town Hall first mentioned.
 1415 -  new building construction begins.
 1559 - Geographer Mercator moves to Duisburg.
 1587 - Municipal charter granted.
 1609 - Elector of Brandendburg in power.
 1655 - University of Duisburg founded by Frederick William, Elector of Brandenburg.
 1687 -  (militia) active (approximate date).
 1714 - Population: 2,983.
 1798 - Population: 4,530.
 1818 - University of Duisburg closed by Frederick William III of Prussia.
 1846 - Cologne–Duisburg railway begins operating.
 1848 - Eintracht Duisburg 1848 sportclub founded.
 1853 - Duisberger Gesangverein (singing group) formed.
 1864 - Population: 14,368.
 1866 - Oberhausen–Duisburg-Ruhrort railway in operation.
 1871 -  coal mine begins operating in Hamborn.
 1873 - Duisburg-Hochfeld Railway Bridge built.
 1880 - Population: 41,242.
 1881 - Horsecar tram begins operating.
 1887 -  built.
 1890
 Kaiser Harbour built.
 Population: 59,285.
 1895 - Population: 70,272.
 1897 - Electric tram begins operating.
 1900 - Population: 92,730.

20th century

1900-1945
 1901 - City Hall and Shipping Exchange built.
 1902 -  founded.
 1905
 Meiderich and Ruhrort become part of city.
 Botanischer Garten der Stadt Duisburg (garden) established.
 Population: 192,346.
 1907 -  built.
 1912 - Theater Duisburg built.
 1917 -  built.
 1919 - Population: 244,302.
 1921 - Wedaustadion (stadium) built.
 1929 - Hamborn becomes part of city.
 1930 - Population: 441,158.
 1934 - Duisburg Zoo founded.
 1940 -  (transit entity) established.
 1941 - Bombing of Duisburg in World War II begins.

1946-1990s
 1950 - Brücke der Solidarität and Schwanentorbrücke bridges built.
 1954 -  built.
 1956 - Deutsche Oper am Rhein opera company established.
 1960 -  built.
 1961 - Population: 504,975.
 1963 -  built.
 1964 - Lehmbruck-Museum of modern art opens.
 1966 - Kreuz Kaiserberg roadway spaghetti junction opens.
 1968 - University of Duisburg re-established.
 1970 -  opens.
 1971 -  (bridge) built.
 1975
 , Rheinhausen, and  become part of city.
  becomes mayor.
 1977 -  cultural festival and  movie festival begin.
 1980 - Bundesautobahn 42 (roadway) opens.
 1981 - Rhein-Ruhr-Marathon begins.
 1982 -  moves to Karmelplatz.
 1985 - Thyssen plant closes.
 1988 -  dance festival begins.
 1990 - Annual Duisburg Music Prize begins.
 1992 -  opens.
 1997 -  becomes mayor.
 1999
  built.
 Landschaftspark Duisburg-Nord created.

21st century

 2003 - University of Duisburg-Essen active.
 2004 -  becomes mayor.
 2007
 August: Italian organized-crime murders occur in Duisburg.
  rebuilt.
 2008
 Turkish-Islamic Union for Religious Affairs  built.
  shopping mall opens.
 2009
 January: 
 30 August:  held.
 2010
 24 July: Love Parade disaster.
 Population: 489,599.
 2012 -  becomes mayor.

See also
 Duisburg history
 
 
 List of mayors of Duisburg (in German)
 Urbanization in the German Empire
 Timelines of other cities in the state of North Rhine-Westphalia:(de) Aachen, Bonn, Cologne, Dortmund, Düsseldorf, Essen, Münster

References

This article incorporates information from the German Wikipedia.

Bibliography

in English

in German
 
 
 
 
 . Geschichte der Stadt Duisburg. Duisburg: Walter Braun Verlag, 1974–1975.

External links

duisburg
Duisburg
Years in Germany
Duisburg
Duisburg